Vitaly Vladimirovich Dunaytsev (born 12 April 1992) is a Russian amateur light welterweight boxer. He won gold medals at the 2015 World Championships and 2015 European Championships and a bronze medal at the 2016 Rio Olympics.

Career 
Dunaytsev was born in Kostanay, Kazakhstan, but the family moved in 2001 to Stary Oskol, Belgorod Oblast, Russia. His father is a retired competitive boxer. Dunaytsev first practiced judo, but after two years changed to boxing. He is a student of the Faculty of Law at the Belgorod University of Cooperation, Economics and Law. He is married to Valeria. Dunyatsev's first notable win was at the 2008 European Junior Championships in Plovdiv, Bulgaria, and in the following years he was quite successful in Youth and Junior National Championships.

Dunaytsev became a two-time Russian National champion (2013–2014) in light welterweight division. He won gold at the 2015 European Championships defeating Pat McCormack of Great Britain in the Finals and in October, Dunaytsev became World Champion in Light welterweight at the 2015 AIBA World Boxing Championships in Doha, Qatar.

On 15 December 2015, by the order of the Sports Minister of Russia, Dunaytsev received the honorary title "Merited Master of Sports".

References

External links

Vitaly Dunaytsev World Boxing Profile
Vitaly Dunaytsev Sports bio

1992 births
Living people
Light-welterweight boxers
World boxing champions
Russian male boxers
People from Kostanay
People from Belgorod
AIBA World Boxing Championships medalists
Boxers at the 2016 Summer Olympics
Olympic boxers of Russia
Olympic bronze medalists for Russia
Olympic medalists in boxing
Medalists at the 2016 Summer Olympics
Sportspeople from Belgorod Oblast